Ilbesheim bei Landau in der Pfalz is a municipality in Südliche Weinstraße district, in Rhineland-Palatinate, western Germany.

Geography 
Ilbesheim lies on the slopes of the Kleine Kalmit, a hill just outside the Haardt range, southwest of the town of Landau in der Pfalz.

References

Municipalities in Rhineland-Palatinate
Palatinate Forest
Südliche Weinstraße
Palatinate (region)